Romeu Luchiari Filho (born 5 August 1953) is a Brazilian sports shooter. He competed in the mixed skeet event at the 1976 Summer Olympics.

References

External links
 

1953 births
Living people
Brazilian male sport shooters
Olympic shooters of Brazil
Shooters at the 1976 Summer Olympics
People from Americana, São Paulo
Pan American Games medalists in shooting
Pan American Games silver medalists for Brazil
Shooters at the 1975 Pan American Games
Sportspeople from São Paulo (state)
21st-century Brazilian people
20th-century Brazilian people